Plum High School is a  public high school and the only high school in Plum Borough School District located at 900 Elicker Road, Pittsburgh, PA 15239, United States. According to the National Center for Education Statistics, in the 2019–2020 school year, the school reported an enrollment of 1,162 pupils in grades 9th through 12th.

Extracurriculars
The school offers clubs, activities and sports. Plum is known for its music program, boasting five bands, five choirs, and three orchestras.

Athletics
The district offers a publicly funded program. The District is part of the WPIAL sports organization.

Cheerleading	
Cross country	(coed)
Golf (CoEd)
Football	
Lacrosse
Soccer (boys and girls)
Tennis	
Volleyball (boys and girls)
Basketball varsity (boys and girls) and 9th grade teams
Rifle (CoEd)
Swimming and diving (boys and girls)
Wrestling
Volleyball varsity and 9th grade teams
Baseball varsity and 9th grade teams
Softball
Tennis
Track and field (boys and girls)

Club sports - indoor track, ice hockey, bowling and crew

Notable alumni
Pat McAfee, host of The Pat McAfee show, former punter for the Indianapolis Colts and current Friday Night Smackdown announcer, Class of 2005.
R. J. Umberger, former NHL player (Philadelphia Flyers, Columbus Blue Jackets), did not graduate from Plum High School
Bill Wilmore, professional bodybuilder, Class of 1990
Mike Miller, offensive coordinator for the Arizona Cardinals, Class of 1988
Steven Fabian, Inside Edition correspondent
Alex Kirilloff, first round pick in the 2016 MLB Draft by the Minnesota Twins
Elias Samson, wrestler

References

External links
Plum Borough School District website

Public high schools in Pennsylvania
Schools in Allegheny County, Pennsylvania
Education in Pittsburgh area